The South Australian Society of Arts was a society for artists in South Australia, later with a royal warrant renamed The Royal South Australian Society of Arts in 1935.

History
A meeting of persons interested in the formation of a society for the promotion of the fine arts was held on Monday evening 13 October 1856 at the Adelaide School of Arts, in Pulteney Street. Owing to the inclemency of the weather very few persons were present. Mr James MacGeorge took the chair. Letters were read from Mr. Fisher, M.L.C., Mr. Tomkinson, Mr. J. Howard Clark, Mr. C. A. Wilson, expressing regret at being unable to attend, but expressing approval of the objects sought to be attained by that meeting. The following resolutions were passed unanimously:—

That a Society, to be called the South Australian Society of Arts, be now formed, 'The annual payment of one guinea shall entitle the subscriber to all the benefits of membership, consisting in free admission to all lectures, meetings, and exhibitions of the Society. 'A donation of painting, sculpture, or other such grant of not less value than £10 sterling, or of £10 in money, shall entitle the donor to all the advantages of membership for life; the Society reserving the right to decline any unsuitable object. 'The Society to be governed by a President, two Vice- Presidents, and a Committee of 10 members, to be elected by the Society annually. 'This meeting requests Mr. Hill to secure promises of membership, and to convene a meeting of the members for arranging the operations of the Society as soon as 50 names are enrolled.' The meeting then adjourned until the time appointed by the prior resolution.

‘That His Excellency Sir Richard Graves Mac Donnell be requested to be the first Patron of the Society.’

‘That the Committee take the necessary steps to have the Society incorporated into the South Australian Institute.'

We give publicity to this series of proposals, with a view of forwarding the interests of the new Society, by affording an opportunity to parsons favorable to its progress of considering and expressing their views regarding the contemplated arrangements. We do not, of course, suppose that with the materials at present in the colony any very rapid strides could be made in the development of works of art of any high pretensions. But the taste for the fine arts which exists without doubt among our community might be cultivated to a point that would give South Australia no mean position in this hemisphere.

We have no doubt that this Society, if successful, will ultimately include a School of Design, and the exhibition of improvements in colonial manufactures. Under the proposed rules of the Society it will be perceived that the promoters already contemplate the exhibition of works of art, either 'pictorial, ornamental, or useful,' and in this they partially carry out the views we would express. It would be necessary to make the laws of the Institution on such a basis as would tend to encourage those manufactures adapted to colonial wants, and involve the development of colonial resources.

A School of Art and Design would obtain a wider scope for its usefulness, and combine with a cultivation of graceful tastes an element of utilitarianism suited to the present position and future growth of the colony. Again, the proposed lectures or discourses on art might be made of immense benefit, if the topics discussed were not simply confined to a description of 'the line of beauty,' or the peculiarities of a classical profile. We imagine that the subjects, if selected with a view to the exposition of manufactures, agriculture, and chemistry, and the adaptability they would bear to colonial uses, would afford an attraction to every class in the community, and secure for the Society the popular support. In making these remarks we wish to be understood as cordially supporting the promoters in their project; but we conceive that a broader basis than that foreshadowed will establish the Society in greater strength and usefulness.

The establishment of a gallery of art would doubtless bring to light many valuable works at present scattered in different parts of the province unknown or unappreciated. When such shall have been collected and classified, we believe great surprise and gratification will be experienced at the extent of our wealth in works of a high class. Probably many paintings of really good character have been brought to this colony, especially from Germany and France, in the possession of families to whom they have descended as heirlooms, and who have hung them upon their walls simply as relics long after the name of the master has been lost, and long after the subject has ceased to be distinguishable under the smoky accumulations of age. If these could be brought together, ample work would be provided both for the connoisseur and the Restoration Committee.

'In addition to works of this class it may fairly be anticipated that many creditable productions will find their way into the exhibition from the easels of colonial amateurs, many of whom are not only industrious, but also deserving of the title of clever artists. And if an exhibition offers advantages to any class of persons, surely the amateur will expect to reap the greatest benefit, for he will have all the influences of comparison and competition. With such prospects before them, we shall feel great disappointment if the promoters of the Society of Arts do not spiritedly carry out their enterprise. From the names of the Provisional Committee — appointed to make rules and regulations for carrying out the objects of the Society— we feel assured that the project will be fairly started under the most favorable auspices, and with a good prospect of success.

The Society first met early in 1857 and became known to the general public by an exhibition held in March of that year, when membership had reached around 60 and some 300 objects were shown, of which around 200 were paintings, though few would have been works by the exhibitor and made in the Colony. Thomas Wilson, in his opening speech, envisaged the formation of a School of Design and an Art Union, by means of which fortunate investors would become owners of local art at a small cost, and artists provided with a living. A competition was held in conjunction with this exhibition, won by J. H. Adamson, with his painting The First Steamer on the Murray, and the Surprise of the Natives. Adamson later worked in New Zealand.

Decline and revival 

At a General Meeting held at the Eagle Chambers on 7 June 1892 Minchin's resignation as secretary was accepted, and a new board elected:
H. P. Gill, president of the School of Design, as president, W. K. Gold (secretary), H. E. Powell (treasurer), and a new committee consisted of A. Scott Broad, M. F. Cavanagh, James Keane, G. A. Reynolds, and W. J. Wadham, all but Keane having been members of Gill's Adelaide Art Circle. M. F. Cavanagh was subsequently named as the society's representative on the board of governors of the Public Library.

At a subsequent General Meeting held on 12 September 1892 at the board room of the Public Library, Museum, and Art Gallery on North Terrace, Chief Justice Samuel Way was elected president, Gold, Powell, and Cavanagh confirmed to their previously elected positions, D. Murray, Henry Scott and Gill as vice-presidents. The 1860 rules were rescinded and the new rules (as amended) were approved to be presented at the October Annual General Meeting in October.

At the end of that year, many members, including Wadham and his brother Alf Sinclair, Reynolds and Broad, left the Society to form the Adelaide Easel Club.

The Easel Club merged with the Society of Arts in 1901, largely through the diplomatic efforts of the society's president, Chief Justice Way and Prof. W. H. Bragg.

Much needs to be written on later history.

Office holders
President
1857–1862 Sir R. G. MacDonnell
1862–1868 Sir Dominick Daly
1868–1873 Sir James Fergusson
1873–1877 Sir Anthony Musgrave
1877–1883 Sir William Jervois
1883–1889 Sir William Robinson
1889–1892 (perhaps) Lord Kintore
1892 H. P. Gill (pro tem)
1892–1909 Samuel Way
1909–1911 H. P. Gill 
1911–1914 John White
1914–1918 James Ashton
1919–1921 John White
1921–1923 Edward Davies
1923–1927 John White
1927–1932 L. H. Howie
1932–1934 Leslie Wilkie
1934–1935 H. E. Fuller
(became Royal South Australian Society of Arts 1935)
1935–1937 L. H. Howie
1937–1940 John C. Goodchild
1940–1950 George Whinnen (died in office)
1950–1953 Duncan Goldfinch
1953–1956 F. Millward Grey
1956–1958 Allan C. Glover
1958–1959 Paul Beadle
1959–1964 John S. Dowie
1964– Stewart Gates

Secretary
1857–1866 James Macgeorge
1866–1885 Abraham Abrahams
1887–1892 R. E. Minchin
1892–1895 W. K. Gold
1895–1898 Sydney H. James (resigned)
1898 H. E. Fuller
1898–1921 Herbert E(dward). Powell
1921–1947 H. E. Fuller (also served as Treasurer for 24 years)
1947–1954 Lisette Kohlhagen

Melrose Prize
Named for Alex Melrose (1865–1944), chairman of trustees of the Art Gallery of South Australia, the prize for portraiture was instituted in 1921 as a £25 prize awarded annually, then £100 awarded triennially from 1949, when the source of its funding changed and was renamed "Melrose Memorial Prize". Prizewinners included:
1921 May Grigg (for a portrait of her father Thomas Grigg)
1922 May Grigg (James Ashton)
1923 d'Auvergne Boxall ("Girl with Orange Scarf")
1925 d'Auvergne Boxall (Self-portrait)
1927 Leslie Wilkie ("Jean")
1928 Leslie Wilkie (George Whinnen)
1929 George Whinnen ("The Student")
1930 J. Wilson (plaster bust of Mr. Wilson Sr.)
1931 Frank L. Collie (plaster statue "What Makes the Wheels Go Round?")
1932 George Whinnen (Lieut. N. C. Adams)
1933 Nora Heysen (Self-portrait)
1934 Everton Shaw (plaster bust of a young woman)
1935 Ivor Hele (James Ferries)
1936 Ivor Hele 
1937 William Rowell ("The Airman")
1938 H. Orlando Dutton
1939 Ivor Hele ("Jean")
1940 Dora Chapman
1941 Nora Heysen ("Mother and Child")
1942 Marguerite Richardson (plaster model ""Crucifix")
1949 Russell Drysdale ("Woman in a Landscape")
1952 Charles Bush
1955 J. Carington Smith
1958 Jacqueline Hick
1961 Dora Chapman
1963(?) John Rigby
1967 Michael Kmit

Exhibitions 
The Society holds regular exhibitions for its members. Each exhibition has a detailed catalog and in recent years has highlighted different artists from different stages of their careers. For example, 'Youthscape' 22 June - 13 July 2014 was a prized exhibition of artworks for artists aged 15–26 years.

Oil painter, Mary Millicent Wigg (1904-2001) from the well-known South Australian stationer E.S.Wigg family exhibited The Loft - Paradise on May 2, 1961 and King's Cross on 7 May 1963 held at the Society of Arts Gallery, Institute Building in North Terrace, Adelaide opened by Allan Sierp on May 7, 1963. Her work was used to illustrate the book E.S. Wigg and his successors published in 1992.

Notes

References

Sources

Art societies
Clubs and societies in South Australia
Australian artist groups and collectives
Organisations based in Australia with royal patronage
1856 establishments in Australia
History of Adelaide
Arts in South Australia